Andre Huebscher (born January 8, 1989) is a German professional ice hockey player.

He is currently playing for Füchse Duisburg in the DEB Oberliga Nord.

References

External links

1989 births
Living people
Grizzlys Wolfsburg players
German ice hockey left wingers
People from Moers
Sportspeople from Düsseldorf (region)